The 2009 HiQ MSA British Touring Car Championship season was the 52nd British Touring Car Championship (BTCC) season. It began at Brands Hatch on the Indy layout on 5 April and finished after 30 races over 10 events on the Grand Prix layout at Brands Hatch on 4 October. Colin Turkington won the championship for the first time, ahead of Jason Plato and Fabrizio Giovanardi.

The season also saw Airwaves BMW score their first win in the series when Rob Collard won the second race of the day at the opening meeting at Brands Hatch. The team seemed to have added a second win in race three as Jonathan Adam crossed the line first but he was demoted to second after making contact with Jason Plato handing Plato the win.

Andrew Jordan became the youngest driver to qualify on pole at Donington after team-mate Fabrizio Giovanardi was excluded for failing technical checks.

Also, Stephen Jelley took his first win in the series at the first race at Rockingham. He followed this up with another victory in race 3, a race that saw Tom Chilton become the first driver to score a podium position in a Ford Focus following a collision between Plato, Turkington and Plato's team mate James Nash.

At the final meeting at Brands Hatch, Chilton took pole position becoming the first Ford driver to do so since 2000. All three races were won by Jason Plato, becoming only the second driver to do so following Dan Eaves' hat-trick at Thruxton in 2005; but this was not enough to win the title. Colin Turkington became British Touring Car Champion for the first time, coincidentally becoming the first Northern Irishman to do so.

Former British Grand Prix winner Johnny Herbert contested the final three meetings in a Team Dynamics Honda Civic.

Entry list

Driver changes
Changed teams
 Tom Chilton: Team Dynamics → Team Aon
 Mat Jackson: BMW Dealer Team UK → RML/Racing Silverline
 Adam Jones: Team Air Cool → Cartridge World Carbon Zero Racing
 Andrew Jordan: Team Eurotech → VX Racing
 Tom Onslow-Cole: VX Racing → Team Aon
 Jason Plato: SEAT Sport → RML/Racing Silverline
 Gordon Shedden: Team Dynamics → Cartridge World Carbon Zero Racing/Club SEAT
 Harry Vaulkhard: Robertshaw Racing → Tempus Sport/bamboo engineering

Entering/re-entering BTCC
 Jonathan Adam: SEAT Cupra Championship (Total Control Racing) → Airwaves BMW
 Dan Eaves: Three-year sabbatical → Cartridge World Carbon Zero Racing
 Matt Hamilton: FIA GT4 European Cup → TH Motorsport
 Johnny Herbert: Speedcar Series (JMB Racing) → Team Dynamics
 Martin Johnson: Renault Clio Cup (Boulevard Team Racing) → Boulevard Team Racing
 Nick Leason: 18-month sabbatical → AFM Racing
 Liam McMillan: SEAT León Supercopa (Triple R) → Maxtreme
 Alan Morrison: Five-year sabbatical → Team Aon
 James Nash: SEAT León Eurocup (SUNRED) → RML
 Paul O'Neill: British GT Championship (Team RPM) → Sunshine.co.uk with Tech-Speed Motorsport
 David Pinkney: British GT Championship (Tech 9 Racing) → Team Dynamics
 Anthony Reid: Porsche Carrera Cup → Team RAC
 James Thompson: World Touring Car Championship (N.Technology) → Team Dynamics

Leaving BTCC
 Michael Doyle: In-Tune Racing → Unknown
 Mike Jordan: Team Eurotech → Britcar (JordanSport.co.uk)
 Steven Kane: Motorbase Performance → FIA Formula Two Championship Test Driver
 Erkut Kızılırmak: Arkas Racing → Turkish Touring Car Championship (Arkas Racing)
 Stuart Oliver: BTC Racing → Truck racing only
 Chris Stockton: BTC Racing → Unknown
 Alan Taylor: Robertshaw Racing → Unknown
 Darren Turner: SEAT Sport → Le Mans Series (Aston Martin Racing) and FIA GT Championship (Gigawave MotorSport)

Mid-season changes
 Gordon Shedden was replaced by James Thompson at Team Dynamics after the opening race weekend.
 Liam McMillan and Nick Leason's respective teams both dropped out after the first three rounds.
 Tom Onslow-Cole replaced Alan Morrison at Team Aon at Croft. The team ran a single car for Tom Chilton in the subsequent two meetings.
 Martyn Bell missed rounds six and seven due to a knee injury; he was not replaced, leaving Paul O'Neill to race the sole Techspeed entry.
 Shedden replaced Dan Eaves at Cartridge World Carbon Zero Racing ahead of round six of the championship.
 Thompson will miss the final three race weekends due to other commitments. He has been replaced at Team Dynamics by Johnny Herbert.
 Anthony Reid raced a third Team RAC car from Silverstone.
 Cartridge World Carbon Zero Racing left the championship before Silverstone.
 Matt Hamilton joined the series at Rockingham.
 Shedden returned to the series at Rockingham under the Club SEAT banner.

Calendar
All races were held in the United Kingdom. The 2009 season had ten race weekends with three BTCC rounds at each. Provisional dates were announced by series organisers on 11 July 2008. The calendar was finalised on 17 March 2009, when all race timetables were announced.

Championship standings

No driver may collect more than one "Lead a Lap" point per race no matter how many laps they lead.
Race 1 polesitter receives 1 point.

Drivers Championship

Note: bold signifies pole position (1 point given in first race only, and race 2 and 3 poles are based on race results), italics signifies fastest lap (1 point given all races) and * signifies at least one lap in the lead (1 point given all races).

Manufacturers/Constructors Championship 

 * Vauxhall penalised 10 points for exceeding engine limit.

Teams Championship 

 * VX Racing, Racing Silverline and Tempus Sport penalised 10 points for exceeding engine limit.

Independents Trophy

Independent Teams Trophy 

 * Racing Silverline and Tempus Sport penalised 10 points for exceeding engine limit.

References

External links 

Official website of the British Touring Car Championship

British Touring Car Championship seasons
Touring Car Championship